The Desiderius Erasmus Stiftung e.V. (DES) is a German political party foundation. It is politically associated with but independent of the right-wing party Alternative for Germany (AfD). The foundation's headquarters are located in Berlin. Its current chairwoman is the former Christian-democratic Member of Parliament Erika Steinbach.

Establishment and mission 

The DES was registered in November 2017 in Lübeck. It was converted into a federal foundation from a foundation in the regional state of Schleswig-Holstein that had been established two years earlier.

It is named after the great European Renaissance humanistic Christian thinker and writer Erasmus of Rotterdam. This provoked ironic comments as the AfD has been extremely critical of the European Union and the Euro currency since its foundation in 2013 by the economist Bernd Lucke. "The name stands for a pro-European but Eurosceptic position of the party", a party spokesperson explained in 2015.
The first chairman of the DES was Konrad Adam, a well-known former journalist.

In 2018, there was an intense competition and power struggle among several foundations to become the officially recognized foundation of the AfD. Party chairman Alexander Gauland preferred to have a foundation named after Gustav Stresemann, a national liberal politician who served as Foreign Minister and briefly Chancellor. Other party grandees like Alice Weidel, the party whip in the Bundestag, supported DES.
In April 2018, the national board of the party decided to accept the association of the Erasmus Foundation. The party convention in June 2018 held a vote and a two thirds majority agreed to adopt the DES as officially associated foundation.

The DES describes their mission as providing civic-democratic political educational programs and the promotion of science and scholarly education.

In accordance with AfD political orientation, the DES has a right-wing orientation. It has held several conferences and political seminars.

In June 2019 they held a large public conference in Berlin on the "growing threats to freedom of speech". Among the speakers where the party chairman Jörg Meuthen, Member of the European Parliament, the media scientist Norbert Bolz and the former GDR dissident and later CDU MP Vera Lengsfeld. The speeches are documented in the first issue of the foundations journal Faktum.

Leadership and board 
Since March 2018, former MP Erika Steinbach is president of the DES. She had left Angela Merkel's Christian Democratic Union party (CDU) in 2017 in protest over the chancellor's open door migration policy.

The foundation has a board of advisors (Kuratorium) chaired by Max Otte, a professor of economics and investment fund manager who is still a member of the CDU. On the board, there are four MPs of AfD and several academics with different backgrounds, such as economists (like Otte or Joachim Starbatty) and legal scholars (like Karl Albrecht Schachtschneider and Alfred-Maurice de Zayas, a US citizen), historians (Karlheinz Weißmann and Lothar Höbelt and others), theologians (like the Dominican father and professor of Christian social ethics Wolfgang Ockenfels) and also several natural scientists, but also some artists and writers or the German-Lebanese film maker Imad Karim who is known for his views critical of Islam. Furthermore, there is also one former member of the Central Council of Jews in Germany, Wolfgang Fuhl, sitting on the advisory board. A couple of board members where formerly affiliated with the CDU, one is a former SPD MP Angelika Barbe, others had connections with small right wing parties.

Financing 

DES finances their operations with private donations and membership fees.

In their party program, the AfD criticizes that the other parties represented in the Bundestag have given their affiliated foundations now more than 600 million Euro funding from the federal budget per year. This, they claim, is a breach of the Federal Constitutional Courts cap's on state financing for parties.
The newcomer party wants to limit state financing of parties and their foundations. Party chairman Alexander Gauland claimed it was his "political end goal" to abolish the system of state financed political foundations.

So far, the DES has not received public funds, since it is sitting in the German parliament, the Bundestag, only since 2017, one term. It is expected that the DES will get a share of the other party's foundations public financing if the AfD gets elected into the Bundestag a second time. In 2017 the German weekly newspaper ’’Die Zeit’’ estimated that the foundation could ultimately get as much as 80 million Euros of public funds.
Funding is likely to be substantially lower. After a first funding request of 1.4 million Euros was rejected by the Ministry of the Interior, the foundation has started legal action.

References 

Alternative for Germany
Political organisations based in Germany
Foundations based in Germany
2017 establishments in Germany
Organizations established in 2017